Léon is the debut album by the Swedish indie-pop singer-songwriter Léon. The self-titled album was released in March 2019 via her own Léon Recordings in partnership with BMG Rights Management. The album features up-tempo songs, such as "Baby Don't Talk", "Falling" and the breakout song "You and I", which were promoted as singles ahead of the album's release, as well as more mellow compositions..

For the album, Léon worked with the production teams Electric and Captain Cuts, while acting as an arranger in the studio and playing some instruments. The resulting sound blends modern electronic pop production with more stripped down arrangements (such as the piano ballad "Come Home to Me"), while the varied styles on the album range from synth-pop to retro-pop and soul with country influences. One of the tracks on the album ("Cruel to Care") is a voice memo recorded on the phone.

Although the album did not make an impact on the charts, entering the Swedish chart only for one week, it generated positive reviews praising its intricate melodies, bittersweet lyrics and the singer's smokey vocals, which drew comparisons with Stevie Nicks and Amy Winehouse.

To promote the album, Léon embarked on a tour starting in Scandinavia, followed by several dates in other parts of Europe and the UK, before kicking off the final leg of the tour with more than 20 dates in North America.

Track listing

Charts

References 

2019 albums
Albums by Swedish artists